|- bgcolor="#FFFAFA"
| Equatorial [ g ] || 201,21 m/s2

HAT-P-9 is a magnitude 12 F star approximately 1500 light years away in the constellation Auriga. A search for a binary companion star using adaptive optics at the MMT Observatory was negative.

The star HAT-P-9 is named Tevel. The name was selected in the NameExoWorlds campaign by Israel, during the 100th anniversary of the IAU. The Hebrew word תֵבֵל tevel means "World" or "Universe".

Planetary system
An exoplanet orbiting the star, HAT-P-9b, was discovered by the transit method on June 26, 2008.

See also
 HATNet Project or HAT
 List of extrasolar planets

References

External links
 Image HAT-P-9
 

Auriga (constellation)
F-type stars
Planetary transit variables
Planetary systems with one confirmed planet